Wedlock is a double album by Massachusetts band Sunburned Hand of the Man, released on the Eclipse Records label in 2005. The album consists of recordings the band made during their trip from the Brattleboro Free Folk Festival to Alaska and during the wedding of band members Paul LaBrecque and Valerie Webb on 21 June 2003, from which the album derives its title.

Track listing

Side A
Procession (feat. The Other Methodist)
The Tent City Roller

Side B
Wedlock

Side C
Sunshine Suit
The Agency

Side D
Double Invisibility
Salmon Sez

Credits
Dave Bohill - keys, drums, voices, oboe
Chad Cooper - electronics, oboe, vocals
Chris Corsano - viola, guitar, voice
Critter - hand drums, voice
Phil Franklin - drums, guitar
Paul LaBrecque - banjo, voice
Marc Orleans - vocals, dobro, drums
Rich Pontius - percussion
Rob Thomas - bass, Q-Tron, vocals
Ron Schneiderman - viola, guitar, bass
Christine Steele - drums, voice
Valerie Webb - vocals, winds
Agent Z & Agent W - drums
Lisa from Seattle - piano
Dave Bird - Telling it like it is

Folk albums by American artists
New Weird America albums
2005 albums